"Theme From Dr. Kildare (Three Stars Will Shine Tonight)" is a song written by Jerry Goldsmith, Pete Rugolo with lyrics by Hal Winn. The song was the theme for the television series Dr. Kildare.  The series' lead actor, Richard Chamberlain, released it in 1962 as a single in his first venture into a singing career.

The single was a success in the charts, becoming a No. 10 hit on the Billboard Hot 100, and No. 12 on the UK Singles Chart.

Charts

Other versions
An instrumental version by Johnnie Spence reached No. 15 on the UK chart.

References

1962 debut singles
Television drama theme songs
Richard Chamberlain songs
Songs with music by Jerry Goldsmith
1962 songs
MGM Records singles